Josef Nesvadba (January 5, 1909 – ?) was a diver who competed for Czechoslovakia. He competed at the 1936 Summer Olympics in Berlin, where he placed 26th in 10 metre platform and tied 15th in springboard.

References

External links

1909 births
Czech male divers
Olympic divers of Czechoslovakia
Divers at the 1928 Summer Olympics
Divers at the 1936 Summer Olympics
Year of death missing